CECOMP Spa (Centro Esperienze COstruzione Modelli e Prototipi) is an Italian automotive company established in 1978 by Giovanni Forneris and is based in La Loggia, Turin. The company specialises in developing prototypes and models for car manufacturers such as Lancia, Maserati and Toyota. Since 2011, the company has expanded into manufacturing, producing the electric Bluecar for the French Bolloré company.

Giovanni Forneris started his career with the Fiat Design Centre and moved on to other well known designers and coach builders in Turin, such as Michelotti and Giugiaro.

Cecomp is a founding partner of the Icona company, which specialises in exporting Italian design and engineering services to China.

Projects 
Notable projects include: 

Maserati Biturbo (1978)
Lancia Delta S4 (1984)
Toyota MRJ (1995)
Lancia Fulvia Coupé Concept (2003)
Bolloré Bluecar (2011)
Icona Vulcano (2015)

See also 

List of Italian companies

References

External links 

Coachbuilders of Italy
Car manufacturers of Italy
Engineering companies of Italy
Turin motor companies
Vehicle manufacturing companies established in 1978
Italian companies established in 1978
Italian brands
Electric vehicle manufacturers of Italy